Morihiro is a Michelin Guide-starred sushi restaurant in Los Angeles, California.

See also 

 List of Japanese restaurants
 List of Michelin starred restaurants in Los Angeles and Southern California
 List of sushi restaurants

References 

Asian restaurants in Los Angeles
Michelin Guide starred restaurants in California
Japanese restaurants in California
Sushi restaurants in the United States